Kathleen Parlow (September 20, 1890 – August 19, 1963) was a violinist known for her outstanding technique, which earned her the nickname "The lady of the golden bow".  Although she left Canada at the age of four and did not permanently return until  1940, Parlow was sometimes billed as "The Canadian Violinist".

Childhood 

Parlow's mother, Minnie, took her to live in San Francisco when Kathleen was four years old.  Minnie Parlow bought her daughter a half-sized violin in San Francisco, and Parlow began receiving lessons from a cousin of hers who was a professional violin teacher, Conrad Coward.  Her progress was very rapid with the instrument, and she soon began to receive lessons from a violin professor, Henry Holmes.

To become a top professional violinist and to begin a concert career, Parlow followed the normal route for North Americans and moved to Europe.  Parlow and her mother arrived in London on January 1, 1905.  Upon attending a concert by Mischa Elman, the Parlows decided to seek out Elman's teacher, Leopold Auer.  Minnie and Kathleen Parlow had arrived in London with $300 raised by their church in San Francisco, which was not sufficient to get them to St. Petersburg, where Auer was a professor.  To pay the cost of travel, the Parlows obtained a loan from Lord Strathcona, the Canadian High Commissioner.  The pair travelled to Russia, and in October 1906, Kathleen Parlow became the first foreigner to attend the St. Petersburg Conservatory.  In her class of forty-five students, Parlow was the only female.

Concert career 
At 17, having spent a year at the conservatory, Parlow began to put on public performances.  She gave solo performances in both St. Petersburg and Helsinki.  Parlow and her mother had little money, and could not otherwise support themselves.  Soon after, Kathleen Parlow made her professional debut in Berlin, and then began a tour of Germany, the Netherlands and Norway.  In Norway she performed for King Haakon and Queen Maud, of whom she would become a favourite.  There she also met Einar Bjørnson, a wealthy Norwegian (son of Nobel laureate Bjørnstjerne Bjørnson) who would become her friend and patron.  Bjørnson purchased for Parlow a Guarnerius del Gesù violin, made in 1735.  The violin cost £2000 and had previously been owned by Viotti.

Parlow travelled Europe with her mother performing for five years.  Auer remained a strong influence on Parlow, who referred to him as "Papa Auer".  Her mother and Auer arranged concerts and opportunities for Kathleen, including concerts with famed conductors such as Thomas Beecham and Bruno Walter.

In November 1910, Parlow returned to North America for a tour.  Parlow performed in New York, Philadelphia, Montreal, Quebec, Ottawa and Kingston.  Her first performance with the Toronto Symphony Orchestra was on March 16, 1911.  Returning to her birthplace of western Canada, Parlow gave performances in Calgary, Regina, Moose Jaw, Saskatoon, Edmonton, Vancouver and Victoria.  Her performances were lauded by provincial premiers, and both mother and daughter Parlow were pleased by her positive reception in western Canada.

Parlow returned to England with her mother in 1911 for further concerts.  Her mother would remain her constant travelling companion, well into adulthood.  She performed in the Ostend Festival, preparing again with Auer.  Parlow maintained a heavy touring schedule, crossing and recrossing the Atlantic to tour both Europe and North America.  She participated in a benefit concert for survivors of the Titanic, and made her first recording at the request of Thomas Edison.  She signed with Columbia Records to produce recordings.

Until 1912, Parlow had performed primarily as a solo artist, but after meeting Ernesto Consolo, an Italian pianist, she began to perform chamber music.

The Parlows were in England when World War I broke out.  During the war, Parlow toured neutral nations of Europe such as the Netherlands, Denmark, Norway and Sweden.  She returned to North America for a tour in the spring of 1916.  She returned to England, but the increasing difficulty of travel kept her there until 1919.  Her former teacher emigrated to New York around this time because of the political situation in Russia, but Parlow worked with him less and less.

Parlow began her fifth tour of North American in December 1920, and she gave her first radio performance in Seattle in April 1922.  After this, Parlow went on a 22-month tour that included Hawaii, Indonesia, China, Singapore, Korea and Japan.  She made recordings for the Nipponophone Company while in Japan.

Parlow continued touring, returning to Europe, but in 1926 she took a break.  Motivated by the stress of traveling or perhaps a broken relationship, she stopped performing for a year.  To renew her career, she traveled to Mexico for concerts.  There she was praised by critics, but her financial situation remained poor.  Her tour of Mexico in 1929 was her first without her mother.

Later years 
With her concert career not particularly profitable, Parlow looked for other career options.  In 1929, she was appointed to the faculty of Mills College in Oakland, California.  She received an honorary Master of Arts degree from Mills College in 1933.  While at Mills College she began to play in string quartets, in which she played violin, and in 1935 she formed the South Mountain Parlow Quartet.

In 1936, Parlow accepted a position at the Juilliard School of Music.  She remained there until World War II, when she returned to Canada and gave a series of lecture-recitals at the Royal Conservatory of Music in Toronto.  She wrote to Sir Ernest MacMillan about a permanent position with the Royal Conservatory of Music, and obtained one in 1941.  While there, she was a teacher for the singer Gisèle LaFleche, violinist Ivan Romanoff, and the conductor Victor Feldbrill.

She became a regular performer with the Toronto Symphony Orchestra as well, bringing additional income.  In Toronto, she organised the Canadian Trio, which she performed in with Zara Nelsova playing the cello, and Sir Ernest MacMillan playing piano.  The trio debuted with a performance of Schubert's Trio in B-flat Major, and Haydn's Trio in A Major and Tchaikovsky's Trio in A minor.  They received excellent reviews and the trio continued performing across southern Ontario, as well as on radio, until 1944.

The Canadian Trio was earning as much as $750 per performance.  Inspired by this success, Parlow started her third string quartet in 1942, called the Parlow String Quartet.  The quartet also included Isaac Mamott on cello, Samuel Hersenhoren as second violin and violist John Dembeck.  Parlow did all the administrative work for the quartet.  The quartet gave concerts in Canada, both live and on radio, but did not travel to any other countries.  Their first performance was broadcast on the Canadian Broadcasting Corporation in 1943, and they remained together for 15 years.  During this time, Parlow remained the head of the quartet, but the other performers were occasionally replaced.

As Parlow's career began to decline, her financial situation became progressively worse, and Godfrey Ridout and other friends of hers established a fund to support her.  In October 1959, she was appointed head of the College of Music of the University of Western Ontario, which provided much needed income.  She died on August 19, 1963, and her will set up the Kathleen Parlow Scholarship for stringed instrument players at the University of Toronto, with the money from her estate and $40,000 from the sale of her violin.

A biography written by her cousin, Maida Parlow French, appeared in 1967.

Students of Parlow 
 Andrew Benac
 Charles Dobias
 Marilyn Doty
 Marjorie Edwards
 Victor Feldbrill
 Sydney Humphreys
 Gerhard Kander
 Morry Kernerman
 Emanuel Leplin
  Jack Montague
 Joseph Pach
 Rowland Pack
 Marianne Moreland Pashler
 James Pataki
 Clara Schranz
 Miriam Solovieff
 Erica Zentner

References

External links 

  (audio)
 
 Archival papers at University of Toronto Music Library
 Digital collection at University of Toronto Music Library

Canadian classical violinists
Juilliard School faculty
Academic staff of the University of Western Ontario
Canadian emigrants to the United States
1890 births
1963 deaths
20th-century classical violinists
Women classical violinists
Columbia Records artists
20th-century Canadian women musicians
Women music educators
20th-century Canadian violinists and fiddlers
Canadian women violinists and fiddlers